The panniculus carnosus is a part of the subcutaneous tissues in vertebrates. It is a layer of striated muscle deep to the panniculus adiposus. In humans the platysma muscle of the neck, palmaris brevis in the hand, and the dartos muscle in the scrotum are described as a discrete muscle of the panniculus carnosus.  Some of the muscles of facial expression in the head are part of the panniculus carnosus.  In other parts of the body, the layer is vestigial, and may be absent or may exist only as microscopic, disconnected fibers.

In other animals, the panniculus carnosus is more extensive. A grazing animal may twitch the panniculus carnosus to frustrate the attempts of a bird to perch on its back. This is known as twitching the withers. For another example, the panniculus carnosus in the echidna covers almost its entire body, enabling it to change its shape to a certain degree, most characteristically by rolling into a ball and presenting its spines to a potential predator.

References

Skin anatomy